John Robert Moolenaar (born May 8, 1961) is an American politician serving as the U.S. representative for Michigan's 2nd congressional district since 2015  (known as the 4th congressional district until 2023). A member of the Republican Party, he served in the Michigan House of Representatives from 2003 to 2008 and the Michigan Senate from 2011 to 2014.

Early life and education
Moolenaar was born in a family of Dutch Americans on May 8, 1961, in Midland, Michigan. In 1983, he earned a Bachelor of Science degree from Hope College. He earned a Master of Public Administration from Harvard University in 1989.

Career 
Moolenaar is a chemist, and worked at Dow Chemical Company for eight months before entering politics. He was elected to the Michigan House of Representatives in 2002, where he served three terms. In 2010, he was elected to the Michigan Senate, where he served one term. Before his election to the legislature, Moolenaar served on the Midland City Council.

In 2014, Moolenaar ran for the United States House of Representatives seat representing . He won the Republican primary election in August, defeating Paul Mitchell, and the general election in November.

Moolenaar and fellow Michigan representative Andy Levin have introduced legislation to delay any deportations of Iraqis to Iraq for two years.

In December 2020, Moolenaar signed an amicus brief before the United States Supreme Court in Texas v. Pennsylvania, et al., which sought to overturn the 2020 United States presidential election results.

Elections 
Moolenaar was elected to represent the 36th district in the Michigan State Senate in 2010. He defeated Democrat Andy Neumann in the November 2 general election, 56,634 votes to 32,154.

Moolenaar ran in the 2014 election for the U.S. House to represent Michigan's 4th District. He won the Republican nomination in the August 5 primary against Paul Mitchell and Peter Konetchy. He defeated Jeff Holmes (D), Will Tyler White (Libertarian) and George Zimmer (U.S. Taxpayers) in the November 4 general election.

U.S. House of Representatives

Committee assignments
Committee on Appropriations 
Subcommittee on Agriculture, Rural Development, Food and Drug Administration, and Related Agencies
 Subcommittee on Labor, Health and Human Services, Education, and Related Agencies

Caucus memberships
 Republican Study Committee
 Republican Main Street Partnership
 U.S.-Japan Caucus

Political positions

Marriage
Moolenaar voted against the "Respect for Marriage Act" codifying Loving v. Virginia and Obergefell v. Hodges, recognizing marriages across state lines regardless of "sex, race, ethnicity, or national origin of those individuals."

2020 presidential election
In December 2020, Moolenaar was one of 126 Republican members of the House of Representatives to sign an amicus brief in support of Texas v. Pennsylvania, a lawsuit filed at the United States Supreme Court contesting the results of the 2020 presidential election, in which Joe Biden defeated incumbent Donald Trump. The Supreme Court declined to hear the case on the basis that Texas lacked standing under Article III of the Constitution to challenge the results of an election held by another state.

References

External links
Congressman John Moolenaar official U.S. House website
Campaign website
 
 

|-

|-

1961 births
21st-century American chemists
21st-century American politicians
American people of Dutch descent
Dow Chemical Company employees
Harvard Kennedy School alumni
Hope College alumni
Living people
Republican Party members of the Michigan House of Representatives
Michigan city council members
Republican Party Michigan state senators
People from Midland, Michigan
Republican Party members of the United States House of Representatives from Michigan